ROKS Wang Geon (DDH-978) is a  in the Republic of Korea Navy. She is named after Wang Geon.

Design 
The KDX-II is part of a much larger build up program aimed at turning the ROKN into a blue-water navy. It is said to be the first stealthy major combatant in the ROKN and was designed to significantly increase the ROKN's capabilities.

Construction and career 
ROKS Wang Geon was launched on 4 May 2005 by Hyundai Heavy Industries and commissioned on 10 November 2006.

RIMPAC 2014 
ROKS Wang Geon, ROKS Seoae Ryu Seong-ryong and a Jang Bogo-class submarine participated in RIMPAC 2014 from 26 June to 1 August 2014.

Gallery

References 

Chungmugong Yi Sun-shin-class destroyers 
2003 ships 
Ships built by Hyundai Heavy Industries Group